Emanuel Borok (15 July 1944 – 4 January 2020) was an American violinist of Russian descent.

Early life and education 
Born in Tashkent, Uzbekistan, Borok studied violin in Riga, Latvia, with Voldemar Sturestep. In 1959, he joined the Gnessin Music School in Moscow, where he continued his studies with Michael Garlitsky.

Career 
Borok won top prizes in the All-Russian Republic and All-Soviet Union violin competitions. He became second concertmaster of the Moscow Philharmonic Orchestra in 1971. In 1973, he emigrated to Israel, where he became concertmaster of the Israel Chamber Orchestra.

In 1974, Borok emigrated to the United States, to take the post of associate concertmaster of the Boston Symphony Orchestra. In parallel, he was concertmaster of the Boston Pops. Borok spent 11 years in his Boston posts. In 1985, he won the position of concertmaster in the Dallas Symphony Orchestra, and joined the Dallas Symphony that year. He initially performed on a Stradivarius violin dating from ca. 1727, owned by the Dallas Symphony, until its theft that year whilst he and the orchestra were on tour. The violin was not recovered until 2005. Subsequently, Borok performed on a 1608 Brothers Amati violin that he owned. On the occasion of the violin's 500th "birthday", Borok returned in 2009 to the town of its creation, Cremona, Italy, and presented it in concert for the people of the city, recorded in the documentary A Cremona con Amore. Borok served as Dallas Symphony concertmaster until his retirement in 2010.

In 2011, Borok was the principal violinist for the Maui Classical Music Festival on Maui, Hawai`i for its 30th season.

Borok taught at the Moores School of Music at the University of Houston. In 2013, he joined the violin faculty at the Meadows School of the Arts of Southern Methodist University as an artist-in-residence.

Personal life 
Borok died in Dallas on January 4, 2020, at age 75, from lung cancer. His survivors include his wife Marilyn, his ex-wife Zinaida, and their two children, Mark and Sarah.

References

External links
 Southern Methodist University, Meadows School of the Arts, page on Emanuel Borok
 Virtuoso Artist Management agency page on Emanuel Borok

1944 births
2020 deaths
Texas classical music
Southern Methodist University alumni
University of Houston alumni
Concertmasters
University of North Texas College of Music faculty
Soviet emigrants to Israel
21st-century classical violinists
Deaths from lung cancer in Texas